Jeffrey Dinowitz (born December 3, 1954) is an American politician who represents District 81 in the New York State Assembly, which comprises Kingsbridge, Marble Hill, Norwood, Riverdale, Van Cortlandt Village, Wakefield, and Woodlawn Heights. Dinowitz has served in the New York State Assembly since 1994.

Early life, education, and family 
Dinowitz was born and raised in the Bronx. He grew up in Soundview before moving to Kingsbridge Heights at age 10. He is a graduate of the Bronx High School of Science, Lehman College of the City University of New York, and Brooklyn Law School.

Dinowitz first entered politics as a volunteer on the George McGovern 1972 presidential campaign. He was also involved in community issues such as tenant advocacy and volunteering on the board of Bronx Council for Environmental Quality during the 1970s.

Prior to entering the Assembly, Dinowitz served for a decade as an administrative law judge for New York.

He and his wife Sylvia Gottlieb have been married since 1978 and now live in the Riverdale section of the Bronx after previously living together in Kingsbridge and Kingsbridge Heights. They have two children: Kara and Eric, and four grandchildren.

Career

New York State Assembly 
Dinowitz was first elected in a special election held in 1994 to replace G. Oliver Koppell. Dinowitz is currently serving as chair of the New York State Assembly Committee on Codes, as well as the Bronx Delegation. He is also a member of Committees on Ways and Means, Rules, Health, Election Law, and is a member of the Puerto Rican/Hispanic Task Force.

Previously, Dinowitz served as Chair of the Assembly Committee on Judiciary from 2018-2020. In 2017, Dinowitz served as Chair of the Assembly Committee on Corporations, Authorities, and Commissions which has oversight of the MTA and public utilities among other entities. Before that, Dinowitz served as Chair of Committees on Consumer Affairs and Protection, Aging, and Alcoholism and Drug Abuse.

Major policy achievements 
Dinowitz has passed hundreds of bills over the course of his tenure in the New York State Assembly. In 2020, Dinowitz was able to pass legislation to protect tenants and homeowners including the Tenant Safe Harbor Act as well as the Emergency Eviction & Foreclosure Prevention Act. Also in 2020, Dinowitz passed legislation to expedite court-ordered apartment repairs in honor of a child (Jashawn Parker) who was tragically killed in a fire while the apartment's landlord was fighting tenants in court to avoid making repairs. Also in 2020, Dinowitz passed legislation to allow absentee voting through 2021 in response to the COVID-19 pandemic.

In 2019, Dinowitz passed a personal record 28 bills through both the Assembly and State Senate. One of these bills, which eliminated all non-medical exemptions to school vaccine requirements attracted worldwide attention and praise from the medical community as well as vitriol from people who do not believe in vaccination.

Dinowitz has also passed legislation in 2016 to enter New York State into the National Popular Vote compact, to enact then-strongest in the nation protections against human trafficking, and more.

Rainbow Rebellion 
Dinowitz was a key figure in the 2008 so-called "Rainbow Rebellion" which united several factions of the Bronx Democratic Party in order to overthrow the party chair, who had been accused of nepotism and patronage in his time as county leader. Dinowitz joined with then-Assemblyman Ruben Diaz Jr., Assemblyman Carl Heastie, Assemblyman Michael Benedetto, then-Assemblywoman Aurelia Greene, and others to overthrow former county leader Jose Rivera. The Rainbow Rebellion ushered in a new era of Bronx Democratic politics and brought nearly unprecedented levels of unity across the borough.

Other political roles 
Dinowitz previously served as Democratic District Leader from 1986 to 1994, originally beating the preferred candidate of the Bronx Democratic Party machine at the time. He has also served as a Democratic State Committeeman (1978), and as a delegate to the Democratic National Convention on multiple occasions. Dinowitz was first elected as a DNC delegate in 1980 as one of the youngest delegates, and was originally committed to the slate for former U.S. Senator Ted Kennedy who was challenging Jimmy Carter (the preferred candidate of the Bronx political machine at the time). He has also served as President of the Benjamin Franklin Reform Democratic Club three times in the past and remains an active member of the club to this day.

Dinowitz is a former Chair of the Bronx Democratic County Committee and is the current Secretary of the Bronx Democratic Party.

Dinowitz was a vociferous of opponent of the Croton Water Filtration Plant, due to the required alienation of 23 acres in Van Cortlandt Park and the expenditure of $3.2 billion, a project spearheaded by former NYC Department of Environmental Protection Commissioner Christopher O. Ward.

References

External links
Official New York State Assembly Member Website.
Gotham Gazette's Eye On Albany: New York State Assembly: District 81
Project Vote Smart: Interest Group Ratings
Dinowitz's response to the 2010 Candidate Questionnaire for State Senate and Assembly from the 504 Democratic Club of New York City

Living people
Jewish American state legislators in New York (state)
Democratic Party members of the New York State Assembly
Brooklyn Law School alumni
Lehman College alumni
1954 births
21st-century American politicians
Politicians from the Bronx
The Bronx High School of Science alumni
21st-century American Jews